The men's long jump event at the 2014 Asian Games was held at the Incheon Asiad Main Stadium, Incheon, South Korea on 30 September.

Schedule
All times are Korea Standard Time (UTC+09:00)

Records

Results

References

Results

Long jump
2014 men